Johanne-Catharina Tecklenborg (6 June 1851 – 11 May 1933) was a German painter.

Life and work 
Born in Bremerhaven, Tecklenborg was the second daughter of the shipbuilder and shipyard owner  (1820-1873) and his wife Sophie (née Ehlers, 1827-1910). Her paintings are still traded at auctions today. Later, living in Munich, she, like many of her contemporaries, committed herself to the education of women artists. In 1914, she resigned from the chairmanship and participation in the committee due to the behaviour of some members. Her career as an artist is typical for a daughter from a "middle-class" home in Bremerhaven.

The , newly founded in 1886, presented works by Tecklenborg in its first exhibition in the same year.

She worked for many decades promoting the Renten- und Pensionsanstalt für deutsche bildende Künstler and helped the organisation to continuously increase its membership.

Tecklenborg died in Munich aged 81 and was buried at Munich Waldfriedhof.

Work 
 Blick auf einen Weiler in flacher Landschaft.
 Blick vom Garten auf ein Städtchen mit Kirche (before 1914).
 In the Spa Gardens of Baden-Baden.
 Nachtliche Flusspartie mit Windmuhlen und Staffage.
 Zwei Mädchen bei der Mittagsrast am Waldesrand, Oil on canvas.

References

Further reading 
 Tecklenborg, Johanne. In Hans Wolfgang Singer (ed.): Allgemeines Künstler-Lexicon. Leben und Werke der berühmtesten bildenden Künstler. Vol. 4: Raab–Vezzo. Literarische Anstalt, Rütten & Loening, Frankfurt 1921,  (Textarchiv – Internet Archive).
 Tecklenborg, Johanna. In Hans Vollmer (ed.): Allgemeines Lexikon der Bildenden Künstler von der Antike bis zur Gegenwart. Created by Ulrich Thieme and Felix Becker. Vol. 32: Stephens–Theodotos. E. A. Seemann, Leipzig 1938, .
 Tecklenborg, Johanna. In Joachim Busse: Busse-Verzeichnis. Verlag Busse Kunst Dokumentation, Frankfurt 1977.
 Tecklenborg, Johanna. In Horst Ludwig: Münchner Maler im 19. Jahrhundert. Bd. „Saffer–Zwengauer“. Bruckmann, 1983, .
 Tecklenborg, Johanna. In : Der moderne Künstler. Zur Sozial- und Kulturgeschichte der kreativen Individualität in der kulturellen Moderne im 19. und frühen 20. Jahrhundert. Suhrkamp Verlag, 1998, .
 Tecklenborg, Johanne on Deutsche Biographie

19th-century German painters
20th-century German painters
German women painters
German landscape painters
German still life painters
1851 births
1933 deaths
People from Bremerhaven